Sir Richard Winfrey (5 August 1858 – 18 April 1944) was a British Liberal politician, newspaper publisher and campaigner for agricultural rights. He served as Member of Parliament for South West Norfolk, 1906–1923, and for Gainsborough, 1923–1924.

Biography
Winfrey was born at Long Sutton in Lincolnshire on 5 August 1858. He married Annie Lucy Pattinson of Ruskington, Lincolnshire, in 1897. His wife's brothers, Samuel Pattinson (1870–1942) and Sir Robert Pattinson (1872–1954), were later both Liberal MPs; Samuel for Horncastle from 1922 to 1924 and Robert for Grantham from 1922 to 1923. In religion Winfrey was a Congregationalist. He was made a Knight Bachelor in 1914.

He died on 18 April 1944 in Castor House, Castor, Peterborough.

Publishing
In 1887, Richard Winfrey purchased the Spalding Guardian, a local newspaper that was to provide the basis for the Winfrey family's newspaper interests. His next purchase was the Lynn News; he also started the North Cambs Echo and bought the Peterborough Advertiser.

During World War II Winfrey's newspaper interests began to be passed over to his son, Richard Pattinson 'Pat' Winfrey (1902–1985) who had himself unsuccessfully stood in the Holland with Boston by-election in 1924. In 1947, under the direction of Pat Winfrey, the family's newspaper titles were consolidated to form the East Midland Allied Press, later the EMAP media group.

Politics
Winfrey first contested South West Norfolk as a Liberal at the general election of 1895 

and tried again in 1900.  

He was elected Liberal MP for South West Norfolk at the 1906 Liberal landslide election 

and he held the seat 

with the help of the Coalition Government coupon

until 1923. He also represented Gainsborough from 1923 to 1924. 

His first career had been as a chemist, and he steered the Poisons and Pharmacy Act 1908 through Parliament.

Office

Between 1906 and 1910, Winfrey served as Parliamentary Secretary to Earl Carrington and Parliamentary Secretary to the Board of Agriculture from 1916 to 1918.

In August 1914 as Mayor of Peterborough he was one of the last to read the Riot Act after anti-German disturbances.

Winfrey also served as a Justice of the Peace. He was Chairman of the Lincolnshire and Norfolk Small Holdings Association, Ltd and sometime Chairman of the National Educational Association. At its foundation in 1906 he was Treasurer of the Eastern Counties Agricultural Labourers & Small Holders Union which in 1920 became the National Union of Agricultural and Allied Workers.

References

External links 
 

1858 births
1944 deaths
Liberal Party (UK) MPs for English constituencies
UK MPs 1906–1910
UK MPs 1910
UK MPs 1910–1918
UK MPs 1922–1923
UK MPs 1923–1924
People from Peterborough
Mayors of Peterborough
People from Long Sutton, Lincolnshire
National Liberal Party (UK, 1922) politicians